Lambda Caeli, Latinized from λ Caeli, is a star in the constellation Caelum. It is also known by its designations HD 30202 and HR 1518. This star is a challenge to view with the naked eye, having an apparent visual magnitude of 6.24. Based on parallax measurements, Lambda Caeli is known to be around 700 light-years distant from the Sun, but is drifting closer with a radial velocity of −4 km/s.

This object is an aging K-type giant star with a stellar classification of K3/4III. Having exhausted the supply of hydrogen at its core, it has cooled and expanded; now having 31 times the radius of the Sun. It is radiating 274 times the Sun's luminosity from its swollen photosphere at an effective temperature of 4,189 K.

References

K-type giants
Caelum
Caeli, Lambda
Durchmusterung objects
030202
021998
1518